Conception: The Gift of Love is an album by American jazz vibraphonist Bobby Hutcherson recorded in 1979 and released on the Columbia label.

Reception
The Allmusic review by Scott Yanow awarded the album 2½ stars stating "This is one of his lesser efforts... Although well played and reasonably challenging, nothing all that memorable occurs".
This album, coming after his beautiful Highway One album is a masterpiece of lyrical, straight ahead Jazz. In an era when albums were produced with one or two passable hits and a bunch of filler, this album stands out as one of the truly beautiful melodic jazz albums ever produced. 
Eliot Coe, Jazz Director, WSND-FM

Track listing
All compositions by Bobby Hutcherson except where noted
 "No Siree Bob" - 7:00
 "Clockwise" (Cedar Walton) - 6:39
 "Remember to Smile" (James Leary) - 5:38
 "Dark Side, Light Side" (George Cables) - 4:06
 "Hold My Hand" (Leary) - 3:58
 "Dreamin'" (Eddie Marshall) - 6:07
 "Quiet Fire" (Cables) - 4:24

Personnel
Bobby Hutcherson - vibes
George Cables - piano
Jon Faddis, Danny Moore, Anthony Tooley, Joseph B. Wilder - trumpet
Robert Alexander, John Gale, Urbie Green - tenor trombone
Hubert Laws - flute
Romeo Pinque - bassoon, bass clarinet
Lenny Hambro - alto saxophone
Daniel Trimboli, Frank Wess - tenor saxophone
James Leary - bass
Eddie Marshall - drums
Bill Summers, Kenneth Nash - percussion

References 

Columbia Records albums
Bobby Hutcherson albums
1979 albums
Albums recorded at Van Gelder Studio